Rennis Ponniah; is a Singaporean Anglican retired Bishop. He was the 9th Bishop of Singapore. He succeeded Bishop John Chew on his retirement on 4 October 2012. He was also the president of the National Council of Churches of Singapore from 2016 to 2018.  He retired in 2020 and was succeeded by Titus Chung.

Education

Ponniah studied in the National University of Singapore and received a Bachelor of Social Science degree; and a Master's in Divinity from Trinity Theological College, Singapore.

Priesthood

In 1990, Ponniah was ordained as a deacon at St Andrew's Cathedral and in 1991, he was ordained as a priest. On 4 May 2005, he was consecrated as the Assistant Bishop of Singapore. Prior to becoming the Anglican Bishop of Singapore, he was Vicar of St John's - St Margaret's Church.

References

Living people
Singaporean Anglicans
Singaporean people of Tamil descent
Singaporean people of Indian descent
Singaporean bishops
Year of birth missing (living people)
Anglican bishops of Singapore